Batha is one of the 23 regions of Chad, located in the centre of the country. It is composed of what was formerly Batha Prefecture with some slight boundary adjustments. The capital of the region is Ati.

Geography
The region borders Borkou Region to the north, Wadi Fira Region and Ouaddaï Region to the east, Sila Region to the south-east, Guéra Region to the south, Hadjer-Lamis Region to the south-west, and Bahr el Gazel Region to the west. The terrain is generally savannah grassland, merging into the Sahara Desert in the sparsely populated north of the region. Lake Fitri is located in the south-west of the region.

Settlements
Ati is the capital of the region; other major settlements include Am Sack, Assinet, Djédaa, Haraze Djombo Kibit, Hidjelidjé, Oum Hadjer and Yao.

Demographics
As per the Chadian census of 2009, the population of the region was 527,031, 51.9% female. The average size of household as of 2009 is 5.1 in rural households and 5.4 in urban areas. The number of households was 103,261: 89,991 in rural areas and 13,270 in urban areas. The number of nomads in the region was 37,419, 9.6% of the population. There were 526,008 people residing in private households. There were 221,810 people above 18 years of age: 98,651 male and 123,159 female. The sex ratio was 0.93 (93 females per 100 males).

The main ethnolinguistic groups are Arab groups such as the Baggara, who predominantly speak Chadian Arabic (33.62%), Dar Daju Daju (percentage not known), Lisi groups such as the Bilala (18.11%) and Naba-Kuka (15.71%), the Masalit (5.73%) and the Masmaje (5.61%).

Economy
As of 2015, internet and telephone were limited and post was the primary mode of communication.

In 2016 gold was discovered in the region, and many people from all over Chad, and some from as far away as Niger and Sudan, began flocking here. However, the Chadian army moved to prevent anyone from getting into the region.

Administration
As a part of decentralisation in February 2003, Chad was administratively split into regions, departments, municipalities and rural communities. The prefectures which were originally 14 in number were re-designated in 23 regions. The regions are administered by Governors appointed by the President. The Prefects, who originally held the responsibility of the 14 prefects, still retained the titles and were responsible for the administration of smaller departments in each region. The members of local assemblies are elected every six years, while the executive organs are elected every three years. As of 2016, there are 23 regions in Chad, which are divided based on population and administrative convenience.

Subdivisions
The region of Batha is divided into three departments: Batha Est, Batha Ouest and Fitri.

References

External links

 
Regions of Chad